The Colombian Red Cross is a Colombian-based nonprofit private entity member of the International Red Cross and Red Crescent Society. It has been a member since 1922. The Colombian Red Cross embraces the principles of the International Red Cross. It provides humanitarian aid to people in need of protection, protection of life and health during armed conflict and disaster relief during emergencies within the Colombian territory. The Colombian Red Cross has played a major humanitarian role within the Colombian Armed Conflict as a mediator in the area of human rights.

History 

The National Society of the Colombian Red Cross was founded in 1915. The idea of founding the Colombian Red Cross was first conceived by physician and member of the National Academy of Medicine Dr. Hipolito Machado and followed by pupil and physician Adriano Perdomo. Other original founders were entrepreneur Santiago Samper who would initially sponsor it and also physicians Jose Maria Montoya and Nicolas Buendia. Some of the people mentioned above were participants in the Thousand Days War. They brought it upon themselves to use a horse-drawn carriage as an ambulance to transport victims in the battlefield.  The society was recognized by the Colombian government in 1916 and it was recognized internationally by the International Red Cross in 1922. Currently it exists under Law 852 of 2003 which rules the scope of the activities of the Colombian Red Cross and under Law 875 of 2004 which regulates the use of the emblem.

Mission 

The Colombian Red Cross mission exists under the principles of the International Red Cross and Red Crescent movement as expressed by the text below:

Translation:

To prevent and to alleviate the suffering and lack of protection of people affected by contingencies, with impartiality, without discrimination of nationality, race, sex, religion, language, social status or political views; the protection of life and health of people and their dignity as human beings, in particular, in time of armed conflict and emergencies; to promote health and social welfare and the preventing of disease; to promote and defend human rights, international humanitarian rights and the fundamental principles of the International Movement of the Red Cross and Red Crescent.

Colombian Armed Conflict 
As a result of the Colombian Armed Conflict and the multiple violations to human rights, the Colombian Red Cross works in the prevention and assistance to victims of the conflict. It has also helped clarify and improve the circumstances under such violations existed.

According to a 2009 report by the ICRC the following is the scope on which the Colombian Red Cross has participated:

Forced disappearance
Homicides and direct attacks against people protected by IHRL
Occupation of civilian properties either private or public
Cases of sexual violence
Recruiting of minors
Cases of physical and psychological abuse and threats
Cases of pollution through weapons that could affect communities
Cases of forced displacement

Fields of work 

National Office of Aid
National Office of Health
Transport of resources
Colombian Red Cross Lottery
Blood Bank
National Office of Teaching
Volunteering
National Office of Cooperation and Development

See also 
International Red Cross and Red Crescent Movement
Human rights in Colombia
List of Red Cross and Red Crescent Societies

References

External links

 (in Spanish)
Colombian Red Cross Society - IFRC
Official Red Cross Web Site 

Red Cross and Red Crescent national societies
Medical and health organisations based in Colombia
Human rights in Colombia